Feiled is a Finnish gothic rock band. Frontman Anton Laurila formed the band in 2001. Its name is a misspelling of the word "failed". The band was first noticed in 2002, after releasing their first demo, "Feiled".

After the release of their second song,  "Lost EP",  a new promo was released and "Feiled" was signed to Poko Rekords. Soon after, the band started working on a full-length album. In 2005 they released the album Midnight Poems followed by a music video for the song "Lost".

Their second album, Testify, produced by Nick Triana, was released early in 2007. The single "Lycanthropy" rose to the top of the Finnish charts and remains the band's highest charted release.

Members
Anton Laurila - vocals. Before starting Feiled he was a drummer who played in genres such as fusion, jazz, and gospel.

2004–2006 

Anton Laurila - vocals
Masi Hukari - guitars
Panu - bass
Henri - guitars
Hank - drums

2006–2007 

Anton Laurila - vocals
Miika Partala - guitar
Mikko Tuliniemi - guitar
Jacob Alexander Grajewski - bass
Janne-Jussi Kontoniemi - drums

Faulty Messenger
After announcing the news of the breakup of Feiled at the end of 2007, Laurila worked with a new band called Faulty Messenger. Anton Laurila was in the process of recording a new studio album.

Anton Laurila - vocals, piano
Masi Hukari - guitar
Tommi Huuskonen - bass
Markus Malin - drums

Discography

Albums 

Midnight Poems (2005)
Testify (2007)

Singles
"Feiled" demo (2002)
"Lost EP" (2003)
"Promo" (2004)
"The Great Escape" (2005)
"Lost" (2005)
"Dive" (10/5/05)
"Just Like Heaven" (2006)
"Lycanthropy" (2007)
"Invincible" (2007)

References

External links
German Feiled site
A LiveJournal Community; The Great Escape
Feiled Mexico

Finnish musical groups